Ulvebreen is a glacier in Sabine Land at Spitsbergen, Svalbard. It is named after Arctic explorer Erik Andreas Ulve. The glacier is a tributary to Nordmannsfonna, and debouches into the bay of Dunérbukta.

References

Glaciers of Spitsbergen